Baron Crook, of Carshalton in the County of Surrey, is a title in the Peerage of the United Kingdom. It was created on 3 July 1947 for Reginald Crook, later Chairman of the National Dock Labour Board.  the title is held by his grandson, the third Baron, who succeeded his father in 2001.

Barons Crook (1947)
Reginald Douglas Crook, 1st Baron Crook (1901–1989)
Douglas Edwin Crook, 2nd Baron Crook (1926–2001)
Robert Douglas Edwin Crook, 3rd Baron Crook (b. 1955)

The heir apparent is the present holder's son Hon. Matthew Robert Crook (b. 1990)

Arms

References

Kidd, Charles, Williamson, David (editors). Debrett's Peerage and Baronetage (1990 edition). New York: St Martin's Press, 1990.

Baronies in the Peerage of the United Kingdom
Noble titles created in 1947